Gottfried Welsch (November 12, 1618 – September 5, 1690) was a German physician born in Leipzig.

In 1644 he became a professor of anatomy at the University of Leipzig, and afterwards a professor of physiology (1647), pathology (1662) and therapy (1668). He held the title of city physician in Leipzig, and in 1665 became rector at the University of Leipzig.

Welsch was one of the founders of German forensic medicine, and remembered for introducing fundamental criteria for evaluation of fatal wounds and poisonings. His best known written work in forensics was the 1660 Rationale vulnerum lethalium judicium.

References
This article is based on a translation of an equivalent article at the German Wikipedia, source listed as: Julius Pagel: ADB:Welsch, Gottfried In: Allgemeine Deutsche Biographie (ADB). Band 41, Duncker & Humblot, Leipzig 1896, S. 681.

1618 births
1690 deaths
17th-century German physicians
Academic staff of Leipzig University
Rectors of Leipzig University
Physicians from Leipzig
17th-century German writers
17th-century German male writers